The 2019 European Tour was the 48th season of golf tournaments since the European Tour officially began in 1972 and the 11th edition of the Race to Dubai.

The Race to Dubai was won by Spain's Jon Rahm, who was also named Golfer of the Year. Scotland's Robert MacIntyre was the Sir Henry Cotton Rookie of the Year.

Changes for 2019

Rule changes
From January 1, 2019 onwards, tournaments followed the new rules released by the USGA and The R&A which were designed to simplify the rule book and speed up the pace of play. The most noticeable changes included golfers being able to putt on the green with the flag remaining in, and drops being made from knee rather than shoulder height.

Scheduling changes
As announced in 2017, the US PGA Championship was moved from August to May, starting in 2019. The PGA of America cited the addition of golf to the Summer Olympics, as well as cooler weather enabling a wider array of options for host courses, as reasoning for the change. It was also believed that the PGA Tour wished to re-align its season so that its FedEx Cup Playoffs would not have to compete with the start of the NFL season in early September, since both United States broadcast partners (CBS and NBC) are NFL broadcast partners.

Consequently, the European Tour moved the flagship event, the BMW PGA Championship, from the congested May date to late September, four weeks after the end of the 2019 PGA Tour season. It was hoped the date would attract more top names.

Changes to the Race to Dubai 
The number of Race to Dubai points available in the Final Series (last three events of the season) was increased, and the field size reduced. The aim was to make more players still have a chance of winning the Race to Dubai entering the Final Series. In addition, although the prize money was not increased, the bonus pool of US$5m would now be split among the top five players rather than the top ten. The money saved from restricting field sizes was used solely to increase the first prizes, which means that the tournaments would not have the standard prize fund distribution, and the DP World Tour Championship, Dubai would have the largest tournament first prize in golf of US$3m.

Tournament changes 
New tournament: Saudi International.
Returning tournament: Alfred Dunhill Championship (not held during the 2018 season due to course renovations)
Tournaments on the European Tour schedule for the first time: ISPS Handa Vic Open, Kenya Open.
Changes to the Rolex Series: the Abu Dhabi Golf Championship replaced the Open de France.
No longer part of the schedule: Joburg Open, Tshwane Open, Sicilian Open, Fiji International, Shot Clock Masters.

Schedule
The following table lists official events during the 2019 season.

Unofficial events
The following events were sanctioned by the European Tour, but did not carry official money, nor were wins official.

Location of tournaments

Race to Dubai
Final top 10 players in the Race to Dubai:

• Did not play

Awards

See also
2018 in golf
2019 in golf
2019 Challenge Tour
2019 European Senior Tour
2019 Ladies European Tour
2018–19 PGA Tour
2019–20 PGA Tour

Notes

References

2019
2019 in golf